Molhem Barakat (8 March 1995 in Aleppo – 20 December 2013 in Aleppo) was a Syrian photojournalist who covered the Syrian Civil War for Reuters. He was killed in 2013 during the Battle of Aleppo.

Career
Barakat began working as a photojournalist for the Reuters news agency in May 2013. His age in December of that year is quoted as 17 or 18, possibly making him a minor at the time.

Death
Barakat was killed on 20 December 2013 during the battle to control the al-Kindi Hospital in Aleppo, alongside his brother, a Syrian rebel. Reuters was widely criticized for sending an "inexperienced teenager" into a war zone. A photograph of Barakat's bloodstained camera was distributed by the Aleppo Media Center.

References

1995 births
2013 deaths
War correspondents of the Syrian civil war
Photojournalists
Syrian reporters and correspondents
War photographers killed while covering the Syrian civil war